The Roman Theatre at Bosra is a large Roman theatre in Bosra, in the district of Dar'a in south-western Syria.

History
It was built in either the second quarter or the second half of the second century AD, and is constructed of black basalt. It is likely that the theatre was built during the reign of Trajan.

The theatre was originally built outside the walls of the town, but was later completely enclosed by an Ayyūbid fortress. The city of Bosra had its fortifications expanded between 481 and 1251. When later integrated into the fortifications, its role was to serve as a citadel and to guard a road leading to Damascus.

The theatre is 102 metres across and has seating for about 17,000 people; it is thus among the largest of the Ancient Roman civilisation. It served a city that once had 80,000 inhabitants. It is also one of the best preserved both in Syria and across the Roman empire. It was substantially restored between 1947 and 1970, before which it contained large quantities of sand, which may have helped to protect the interior.

Syrian Civil War

, the site is still on the UNESCO's list of World Heritage in Danger. The theatre was added to the list in 2013.

The site has been damaged in the Syrian Civil War by various military activities conducted nearby. For instance, snipers have been active at the site.

See also
 List of Roman theatres

References

External links

Video of the theatre – UNESCO/NHK Videos on Heritage
Articles, videos and aerial view of Bosra Theatre 

Bosra
Buildings and structures in Daraa Governorate
Buildings and structures completed in the 2nd century
Ancient Roman theatres in Syria